Kamini is a 1974 Indian Malayalam film, directed by Subair and produced by H.H. Abdulla Settu and Anwar. The film stars Rani Chandra, Prema, T. R. Omana , Raghavan and T. S. Muthaiah in the lead roles. The film has musical score by M. S. Baburaj.

Cast
Prema as Doctor
T. R. Omana as Lakshmi
Raghavan as Chandran
T. S. Muthaiah as Rajasekharan
Alleppey Vincent as Prakash 
Baby Sumathi as Young Hema 
Bahadoor as Ashokan
Kuthiravattam Pappu as Appu
Rani Chandra as Vasanthi
Roja Ramani  as Hema

Soundtrack
The music was composed by M. S. Baburaj and the lyrics were written by Subair.

References

External links
 

1974 films
1970s Malayalam-language films
Films directed by I. V. Sasi